The Producers Guild Film Award for Best Male Playback Singer (previously known as the Apsara Award for Best Male Playback Singer) is given by the producers of the film and television guild as part of its annual award ceremony to recognise the best Indian film of the year. Following its inception in 2004, no one was awarded in 2005 and 2007.

Superlatives

Winners and Nominees

2000s
 2004 Sonu Nigam - Kal Ho Naa Ho Kal Ho Naa Ho
 Abhijeet- Tauba Chalte Chalte
 Udit Narayan - Idhar Chala Koi... Mil Gaya
 Adnan Sami - Ishq Hota Nahi Joggers Park
 Kailash Kher - Allah Ke Bande Waisa Bhi Hota Hai Part II
 2005 - no award
 2006 Kunal Ganjawala - Bheegey Honth Tere Murder
 Udit Narayan - Main Yahan Hoon Veer-Zaara
 Atif Aslam - Woh Lamhe Zeher
 Rahat Nusrat Fateh Ali Khan - Jiya Dhadhak Kalyug
 Shaan - Main Aisa Kyon Hoon Lakshya
 2007 – No award
 2008 Shaan - Jab Se Tere Naina Saawariya
 KK - Ankhon Mein Teri Om Shanti Om
 Sonu Nigam - Tainu Leke Salaam-E-Ishq
 Soham - In Dino Life in a... Metro
 Sukhvinder Singh - Chak De India Chak De! India
 2009 Shankar Mahadevan – Maa Taare Zameen Par
 Atif Aslam – Pehli Nazar Mein Race
 Rashid Ali – Kabhi Kabhi Aditi Jaane Tu Ya Jaane Na
 KK – Khuda Jaane Bachna Ae Haseeno
 A.R. Rahman – Khwaja Jodhaa Akbar

2010s
 2010 Mohit Chauhan – Ye Dooriyan Love Aaj Kal
 Javed Ali & Sonu Nigam – Guzarish Ghajini
 Roop Kumar Rathod – Tujh Men Rab Dikhta Hai Rab Ne Bana Di Jodi
 Sukhwinder Singh & Vishal Dadlani – Dhan Te Nan Kaminey
 Shankar Mahadevan – Wake Up Sid Wake Up Sid
 2011 Rahat Fateh Ali Khan - Dil Toh Bachcha Hai Ji' - Ishqiya
 Mohit Chauhan - Pee Loon - Once Upon a Time in Mumbai
 Rahat Fateh Ali Khan - Tere Mast Mast Do Nain Dabangg
 KK - 'Sajde Kiye' Khatta Meetha
 Aadesh Shrivastava - Mora Piya Raajneeti
 Shafqat Amanat Ali - 'Tere Naina' - My Name Is Khan
 2012 Mohit Chauhan - Sadda Haq Rockstar
 Rahat Fateh Ali Khan - Teri Meri Bodyguard
 Muhammad Irfaan - Phir Mohabbat Murder 2
 Akon - Chammak Challo Ra.One
 Mohit Chauhan - Naadan Parindey Rockstar
 Tochi Raina - Saibo Shor in the City
 2013 Ayushmann Khurrana - "Paani Da Rang" - Vicky Donor
 Amitabh Bachchan - "Ekla Chalo Re" - Kahaani 2
 Mika Singh & Wajid - "Chinta Ta Ta Chita Chita" - Rowdy Rathore
 Mohit Chauhan - "Ala Barfi" - Barfi!
 Neeraj Shridhar - "Tumhi Ho Bandhu" - Cocktail
 Nikhil Paul George - "Main Kya Karoon" - Barfi!
 2014 Arijit Singh - "Tum Hi Ho" - Aashiqui 2
 Ankit Tiwari - "Sunn Raha Hai" - Aashiqui 2
 Atif Aslam - "Jeene Laga Hoon" - Ramaiya Vastavaiya
 Amit Trivedi & Mohan Kanan - "Manjha" - Kai Po Che!
 Aditya Narayan - "Tattad Tattad" & "Ishqyaun Dhishqyuan" - Goliyon Ki Raasleela Ram-Leela
 Siddharth Mahadevan - "Malang" - Dhoom 3
 2015 Ankit Tiwari - "Galliyan" - Ek Villain
 Labh Janjua - "London Thumakda" - Queen
 Arijit Singh - "Aa Raat Bhar" - Heropanti
 Arijit Singh - "Samjhawan" - Humpty Sharma Ki Dulhania
 Sukhwinder Singh - "Bismil" - Haider
 Arijit Singh - "Humdard" - Ek Villain
 Shaan - "Chaar Kadam" - PK

 2016  Arijit Singh - "Hamari Adhuri Kahani" - Hamari Adhuri Kahani
 Arijit Singh - "Khamoshiyan" - Khamoshiyan
 Arijit Singh - "Sooraj Dooba Hain" - Roy

References

Producers Guild Film Awards